"Violet Hill" is a 2008 song by Coldplay.

Violet Hill may also refer to:

 Violet Hill, Arkansas
 Violet Hill (Hong Kong), a hill on Hong Kong Island
 Violet Hill, London, which the song was named after.
 Violet Hill Gardens, a garden in London
 Violet Hill Hospital, a Hospital in England
 Violet Hill, Ontario
 Violet Hill, Pennsylvania
 Violet Hill Road, in Dutchess County, New York